The 2019 BGL BNP Paribas Luxembourg Open was a professional women's tennis tournament played on indoor hard courts sponsored by BNP Paribas. It was the 24th edition of the Luxembourg Open, and part of the WTA International tournaments category of the 2019 WTA Tour. It was held in Kockelscheuer, Luxembourg from 14 to 20 October 2019.

Points and prize money

Point distribution

Prize money

1 Qualifiers prize money is also the Round of 32 prize money
* per team

Singles entrants

Seeds 

 Rankings as of 7 October 2019

Other entrants 
The following players received wildcards into the singles main draw:
  Mandy Minella
  Jeļena Ostapenko
  Katie Volynets 

The following player received entry using a protected ranking into the singles main draw:
  Denisa Allertová
  Shelby Rogers

The following players received entry from the qualifying draw:
  Marta Kostyuk 
  Antonia Lottner
  Monica Niculescu 
  Chloé Paquet

The following player received entry as a lucky loser:
  Bibiane Schoofs

Withdrawals 
Before the tournament
  Marie Bouzková → replaced by  Misaki Doi
  Madison Brengle → replaced by  Laura Siegemund
  Danielle Collins → replaced by  Caty McNally
  Alizé Cornet → replaced by  Tamara Korpatsch
  Angelique Kerber → replaced by  Aliona Bolsova
  Kateryna Kozlova → replaced by  Bibiane Schoofs
  Rebecca Peterson → replaced by  Tatjana Maria
  Lesia Tsurenko → replaced by  Sorana Cîrstea

Retirements 
  Margarita Gasparyan (back injury)
  Andrea Petkovic (left knee injury)
  Alison Van Uytvanck (left ankle injury)

Doubles entrants

Seeds 

 1 Rankings as of 7 October 2019

Other entrants
The following pairs received a wildcard into the doubles main draw:
  Elizabeth Mandlik /  Katie Volynets  
  Eléonora Molinaro /  Katarzyna Piter

The following pair received entry as alternates:
  Amandine Hesse /  Chloé Paquet

Withdrawals
Before the tournament
  Ysaline Bonaventure (left shoulder injury)
  Monica Niculescu (left lower leg injury)

Champions

Singles 

  Jeļena Ostapenko def.  Julia Görges, 6–4, 6–1

Doubles

  Coco Gauff /  Caty McNally def.  Kaitlyn Christian /  Alexa Guarachi, 6–2, 6–2

References

External links 
 

2019 WTA Tour
2019
2019 in Luxembourgian tennis
Luxembourg Open